Hakam (Ḥakam ), one of the names of God in Islam, meaning "The Judge", "The Giver of Justice", or "The Arbitrator". Also used as a personal name.

As a Name of Allah 
In Islamic belief "Al-Hakam" is the One who always delivers justice, in every situation, to everyone. Nothing happens in creation except by His authority and decree. Al-Hakam never wrongs anyone and is never oppressive. He is the only true Judge; no one can overturn His judgment or change his decree.

Hakam comes from the root Haa - kaaf- meem ح ک م which refers to the attribute of judging, being wise, passing a verdict, and preventing or restraining people from wrongdoing.

External links
 The Names of Allah – 29-30 Al-Hakam

References

Allah
Arabic masculine given names
Names of God in Islam